is a Japanese manufacturer of precision instruments for measurement and analysis. They make instruments that measure and analyze automobile exhaust gas (80% share of the world market), and environmental, medical and scientific applications.

Horiba is one of the top 25 analytical and life sciences instrumentation companies in the world.

The group has been involved in measurement technology for more than 50 years. It is diversified in 5 different sectors: automotive tests systems (36% activity), environmental (11%), medical (17%), semiconductor (19%) and scientific fields (17%). Today, the group, chaired by Atsushi Horiba, gathers 5,965 employees worldwide and generated 1 294 million of dollars in 2014.

The motto of HORIBA Ltd. is "Joy and Fun".

Development of the company 
 

Horiba was founded in 1945 by Masao Horiba, who graduated in nuclear physics from Kyoto University and in the early 1950s started mass-production of pH meters. The present company was registered in 1953. From 1959 until 2002, Hitachi was a principal shareholder, and the two companies retain close connections.

In 1972, the company established subsidiaries in America and Europe. In 1996–7, Horiba acquired two French companies: the specialist blood cell counter maker ABX SA (currently called Horiba ABX SAS) in 1996, and optical equipment maker Instruments SA (currently Horiba Jobin Yvon SAS) in 1997.

In 2005, Horiba acquired German company Schenck Development Test Systems (including Schenck Pegasus), expanding the automotive market product range to include engine and driveline testing tools, including brake testing and wind-tunnel balances, and the Interautomation Group of Ontario, Canada, with its real-time pre-emptive kernel Linux-based ADACS data acquisition and control software suite.

Horiba's diversification, and establishing of overseas subsidiaries, decoupled Horiba from the stagnant Japanese industrial market, and Japanese domestic sales dropped from 62% of total sales in 1995 to 35% in 2008. The Horiba group now consists of about 42 companies, spread over about 15 countries.

HORIBA Medical

The HORIBA Medical segment designs and manufactures medical instruments and reagents for the in vitro diagnostics industry. The segment, headquartered in Montpellier (France) is presents on Hematology, clinical chemistry and hemostasis markets in over 110 countries. The 1,080 employees produce 7,500 instruments and 10,000 tons of reagents annually for public and private sectors. Acquired in 1996 by HORIBA Group, the subsidiary was originally named ABX Company, founded  in 1983. ABX Company was known for the launch of the smallest hematology analyzer of the world at this time, the Minos. Since joining the Japanese Group HORIBA, segment sales have continued to grow exponentially to reach 210 million of dollars (December 2014).

Products
The HORIBA Medical Segment manages the entire lifecycle of in vitro diagnostic systems worldwide that are  mainly destined for biological analysis in a medical laboratory. These automated analyzers are designed for various users including patients, doctors, private laboratories, clinics and university hospitals.

Overseas Locations

 Austria: Horiba (Austria) GmbH
 Brasil:   HORIBA Brasil Holding 
HORIBA Instruments (Brasil) Ltda
 Canada: Horiba Automotive Test Systems Inc.
 China: Horiba Instruments (Shanghai) Co., Ltd.
Horiba Trading (Shanghai) Co., Ltd.
 France:   HORIBA EUROPE HOLDING
HORIBA ABX SAS
HORIBA France SAS
 Germany: Horiba Automotive Test Systems GmbH
Horiba Europe GmbH
Horiba Europe Automation Division GmbH
Horiba Jobin Yvon GmbH
 India: Horiba India Private Limited
 Italy: Horiba Jobin Yvon Srl

 Japan: Horiba, Ltd.
Horiba STEC, Co., Ltd.
Horiba Advanced Techno Co., Ltd.
Horiba Techno Service Co., Ltd.
Horiba Itech Co., Ltd.
 Korea: Horiba Korea Ltd.
Horiba Automotive Test Systems Ltd.
Horiba STEC Korea, Ltd.
 Poland: Horiba ABX Sp. zo. o.
 Singapore: Horiba Instruments (Singapore) Pte Ltd.
 Thailand: HORIBA Holding (Thailand) Ltd.
HORIBA (Thailand) Ltd.
 UK: HORIBA UK Limited
HORIBA Instruments
HORIBA Jobin Yvon Ltd
HORIBA MIRA Ltd
HORIBA Test Automation Ltd
HORIBA STEC
 USA: Horiba International Corporation
Horiba Instruments Incorporated
Horiba/STEC Incorporated
Horiba Automotive Test Systems Corp.

Gallery

See also

 Engine test stand - with information about engine testing

References

External links
Horiba, Ltd. website 
Horiba Gaia report

Electronics companies of Japan
Manufacturing companies based in Kyoto
Companies listed on the Tokyo Stock Exchange
Technology companies established in 1945
Research support companies
Defense companies of Japan
Disaster preparedness
Japanese brands
Japanese companies established in 1945